The NASCAR Whelen Euro Series (formerly known as Racecar Euro Series and Euro-Racecar NASCAR Touring Series) is an official NASCAR stock-car racing series based in Europe. It is one of NASCAR's four international-sanctioned series, alongside the NASCAR Pinty's Series, the NASCAR Mexico Series and the NASCAR Brasil Sprint Race, and is the only one based in Europe.

History

French rally driver Jérôme Galpin conceived the idea of a European-based stock car racing series after he watched a NASCAR race in 2002. His family group, Team FJ, then launched the Racecar Euro Series in June 2008, and announced that the first season would be held the following year as a FFSA-sanctioned series. The first season in 2009, was held on 7 tracks across France, with 16 cars entering the inaugural race at Nogaro. The series was approved as an International Series by the Fédération Internationale de l'Automobile (FIA) after the series held a race at the Nürburgring in 2010. The calendar was expanded further in 2011, to include more races in Europe.

Galpin began to make connections with NASCAR after he had contact with NASCAR's Senior Development Business Director, Robert Duvall, in June 2009. NASCAR soon took interest in the series, and later in 2010, the then-Racecar Euro Series champion Lucas Lasserre was invited to enter the Toyota All-Star Showdown.

In early 2012, Team FJ entered into an agreement with NASCAR to sanction the series as part of the NASCAR circuit until 2020, though it remains registered as an International FIA series. As part of the agreement, the series changed its name to the Euro-Racecar NASCAR Touring Series.

With the new agreement with NASCAR, the series became an official NASCAR racing series in Europe. NASCAR rules and standards were adopted in the series. The champion was invited to the NASCAR Night of Champions Gala at the NASCAR Hall of Fame in Charlotte, North Carolina, along with the rest of the regional series champions, with the 2012 champion Ander Vilariño being the first to attend.

On July 1, 2013, the series was renamed the NASCAR Whelen Euro Series after Whelen Engineering announced an agreement to become the title sponsor of the series through 2018. This agreement was extended on December 6, 2017, after NASCAR announced that Whelen Engineering would continue to be the title sponsor of both the Euro Series and the NASCAR Whelen Modified Tour until 2024.

On October 4, 2019, the series announced that NASCAR and Team FJ would continue to work together to operate the series until at least 2030. On October 22, 2019, the NASCAR Whelen Euro Series announced that the classes would be rebranded from Elite 1 and Elite 2 to EuroNASCAR PRO (ENPRO) and EuroNASCAR 2 (EN2) for the 2020 season.

Tracks

The following are the tracks which have been used since 2009, currently are in use, and/or are scheduled to be used in the NASCAR Whelen Euro Series as sanctioned by NASCAR:

Notes

Cars
The NASCAR Whelen Euro Series is based around the concept of using NASCAR-style cars on European circuits. The Euro-NASCAR cars are inspired by American NASCAR cars but were built specifically for European tracks. The cars use a V8 engine creating . It uses a four-speed manual gearbox, is rear-wheel drive and weighs .

A new generation of car, dubbed as the "Next Level" package, was introduced in the 2016 season. The Next Level car saw the introduction of a new aerodynamic package and a redesigned composite body, and the cars adopted an 8-inch rear spoiler instead of the wing used in the previous generation of cars.

The first Next Level car to be introduced was the redesigned Chevrolet SS composite body, which was unveiled during the 2015 season-ending race at Circuit Zolder. Resembling the body of its American counterpart, the car made its racing debut in the 2015 Race of Champions. The Ford Mustang body also made its test debut soon after. Starting in 2018, the Chevrolet composite body was updated into a Camaro ZL1-based body style, although the SS body is still legal for competition until the end of the 2019 season. The SS nameplate was subsequently retired in 2020 and existing bodies from the SS platform was rebranded into the EuroNASCAR FJ 2020. The revived Shadow Racing Cars brand would began to compete with their own Shadow DNM8 chassis starting from the 2021 season.

NASCAR Whelen Euro Series became the first NASCAR series to introduce sequential gearboxes after it was announced on 25 March 2021 that sequential gearboxes will be made available as an optional choice in 2021, predating NASCAR Cup Series' introduction of the sequential gearboxes with the Next Gen car by one year. A new NASCAR Whelen Euro Series car is available to be purchased from Team FJ at a price of €89,000 in 2021.

NASCAR Whelen Euro Series currently featured Hoosier as the exclusive tyre supplier of the series. Previously, Michelin was the exclusive tyre supplier from the inaugural season in 2009 until 2017 while subsidiary company BFGoodrich became the exclusive tyre supplier for the 2018 season only. In 2019, Continental AG signed a six-year contract to become the exclusive tyre supplier of the series. The deal was renewed on January 22, 2021, extending the tyre supply contract until 2027. General Tire was selected as the tyre brand of choice in the 2019 and 2020 season before it was switched to the Hoosier brand for the 2021 season.

On 3 May 2022, NASCAR Whelen Euro Series announced a new partnership deal with VP Racing Fuels to become the new exclusive fuel supplier in the series, switching from a previously undisclosed fuel supplier. The series will now use VP's N20 Race Fuel, an unleaded gasoline sustainable fuel that incorporates 20% sustainable materials and is complying to both FIA Appendix J and European Union's E10 road fuel regulations. The series will be working together with VP to further develop the sustainable fuel with an aim to become fossil fuel free by the 2025 season.

Outside of NASCAR Whelen Euro Series competition, the NASCAR Euro Series cars are used in the Race of Champions.

Specifications

Chassis: FIA-certified tubular steel tube frame with safety roll cage.
Engine Displacement:  (350 in³) V8.
Aspiration: Naturally aspirated.
Transmission: 4 Speed manual or sequential.
Fuel: VP Racing Fuels N20 Race Fuel
Power: 
Weight: 
Height: 
Length: 
Wheelbase: 
Width: 

As manufacturer involvement is limited, model representations are used for aesthetic purposes only. The current models available are the EuroNASCAR FJ 2020, Ford Mustang, Chevrolet Camaro, Shadow DNM8, and Toyota Camry. The Dodge Challenger model was available to be used in the past before it was retired after Dodge pulled out factory support for all NASCAR series outside of Canada in 2012, while the Chevrolet SS model was retired after it was rebranded into the EuroNASCAR FJ 2020 in 2020.

Championships
EuroNASCAR Pro drivers championship – Main championship open to gold/silver/bronze drivers
Junior Trophy – For drivers aged 25 years and under
Challenger Trophy – For amateur drivers
EuroNASCAR 2 drivers championship – Restricted to silver/bronze drivers
Legend Trophy – For drivers aged 40 years and over
Rookie Cup – For drivers making their Euro Series debuts, regardless of age or experience
Lady Cup – For female drivers
Teams championship – Scored by points collected by each car in EuroNASCAR PRO and EuroNASCAR 2 divisions

The Euro Series champions and other standout drivers of the series will be honored at the yearly NASCAR Home Tracks Champions Awards at the NASCAR Hall of Fame. Until the 2014 season, the EuroNASCAR PRO champion wins entry into a NASCAR race, the UNOH Battle at the Beach (formerly the Toyota All-Star Showdown), while the Elite 2 champion wins a NASCAR test.

A NASCAR Whelen Euro Series race week is run over three days and includes four races, two EuroNASCAR PRO races and two EuroNASCAR 2 races. Practice is held on Friday, followed by qualifying and the first races of EuroNASCAR PRO and EuroNASCAR 2 on Saturday, before the week closes with the second races of EuroNASCAR PRO and EuroNASCAR 2 on Sunday. The only exception to this were the race at Venray in 2019, which was run over two days and only included one race each for both classes and the 2020 race at Vallelunga, which was held using a condensed variant of the schedule as part of the sporting regulation changes made as a response to the COVID-19 pandemic.

Champions

All-time wins
All-time wins for the NASCAR Whelen Euro Series under NASCAR official sanctioning, starting from the 2012 season; does not include Racecar Euro Series wins. All figures correct as of the 2022 EuroNASCAR Finals at Automotodrom Grobnik (October 30, 2022).

Elite 1 / EuroNASCAR PRO (ENPRO)

Elite 2 / EuroNASCAR 2 (EN2)

See also

Speedcar Series
ASCAR Racing Series

References

External links

 
NASCAR Whelen Euro Series en español
 Racing Reference

 
Recurring sporting events established in 2009
Stock car racing
2009 establishments in France
Whelen Euro